For Love or Money - a pictorial history of women and work by filmmaker-authors Megan McMurchy, Margot Oliver and Jeni Thornley is a companion book to the film of the same name (For Love or Money) released in 1983. This project arose out of the 1977 Women’s Film Production Workshop and the 1978 inaugural Women and Labour Conference. It involved interviews with many women and research into hundreds of feature films, documentaries, home movies, commercials and news reels and effectively revealed the working lives of Australian women. Feminist and union activist, Edna Ryan, who had been instrumental in achieving equal pay for women, also made editorial contributions to both the film and book. The film has been digitised and was screened at the 2017 Sydney Film Festival when it was hailed as "a major work of historical research, a masterclass of montage editing and a classic essay film."

References

Penguin Books books
Australian non-fiction books
1983 non-fiction books
History of women in Australia